Goetz von Berlichingen is a 1955 Austrian historical adventure film directed by Alfred Stöger and starring Ewald Balser, Auguste Pünkösdy and Raoul Aslan. It is a filmed version of the 1773 play Götz von Berlichingen by Johann Wolfgang von Goethe. It was shot at the Burgtheater in Vienna.

Cast
 Ewald Balser as Götz von Berlichingen
 Auguste Pünkösdy as Elisabeth, seine Frau
 Hilde Mikulicz as Maria, seine Schwester
 Raoul Aslan as Kaiser Maximilian
 Albin Skoda as Adelbert von Weislingen
 Judith Holzmeister as Adelheid von Walldorf
 Fred Liewehr as Franz von Sickingen
 Ulrich Bettac as Bischof von Bamberg
 Felix Steinboeck as Bruder Martin
 Philipp von Zeska as Kaiserlicher Rat
 Stefan Skodler as Hans von Selbitz
 Paul Pranger as Ein Nürnberger Kaufmann
 Helmut Janatsch as Franz
 Alfons Lipp as Georg
 Fred Hennings as Lerse

References

Bibliography 
 Goble, Alan. The Complete Index to Literary Sources in Film. Walter de Gruyter, 1999.

External links 
 

1955 films
1950s historical adventure films
Austrian historical adventure films
1950s German-language films
Films directed by Alfred Stöger
Austrian films based on plays
Films based on works by Johann Wolfgang von Goethe
Films set in the 16th century
Films set in the Holy Roman Empire
Filmed stage productions
Austrian black-and-white films